The 2021–22 Pittsburgh Panthers men's basketball team represented the University of Pittsburgh during the 2021–22 NCAA Division I men's basketball season. The Panthers were led by fourth-year head coach Jeff Capel and played their home games at the Petersen Events Center in Pittsburgh, Pennsylvania as members of the Atlantic Coast Conference.

The Panthers finished the season 11–21 overall and 6–14 in ACC play to finish in a three way tie for eleventh place.  As the twelfth seed in the ACC tournament, they lost to thirteenth seed Boston College in the First Round.  They were not invited to the NCAA tournament or the NIT.

Previous season
In a season limited due to the ongoing COVID-19 pandemic, the Panthers finished the 2020–21 season 10–12, 6–10 in ACC play to finish in 12th place. They lost to Miami in the first round of the ACC tournament.

Offseason

Departures

Incoming transfers

Recruiting classes

2021 recruiting class

2022 recruiting class

Roster

Schedule and results

|-
!colspan=9 style=| Exhibition

|-
!colspan=9 style=| Regular season

|-
!colspan=9 style=| ACC Tournament

Source

Rankings

*AP does not release post-NCAA tournament rankings^Coaches did not release a Week 2 poll.

References

Pittsburgh Panthers men's basketball seasons
Pittsburgh
Pittsburgh
Pittsburgh